The following are the national records in athletics in Hong Kong, maintained by Hong Kong Amateur Athletic Association (HKAAA).

Outdoor

Key to tables:

+ = en route to a longer distance

h = hand timing

A = affected by altitude

Men

Women

Indoor

Men

Women

Notes

References
General
Hong Kong Outdoor Records 9 December 2022 updated
World Athletics Statistic Handbook 2022: National Indoor Records
Specific

External links
HKAAA web site

Hong Kong
Records
Athletics
Athletics